The mayor of Hurunui officiates over the Hurunui District of New Zealand's South Island. The district is administered by a district council. The current mayor is Marie Black, elected in the 2019 New Zealand local elections.

Hurunui District was formed in the 1989 local government reforms through the amalgamation of Amuri County, Cheviot County, and Ashley County. The last chairman of Amuri County, John Chaffey, became the first mayor of Hurunui District. Chaffey was still mayor in 1999. Subsequent to the October 2001 elections, Tony Arps was mayor. Garry Jackson was mayor from 2004 to 2010, when he retired. Winton Dalley was the mayor of Hurunui from 2010 to 2019.

List of officeholders
Since its formation in 1989, Hurunui District has had five mayors. The following is a complete list:

References

Hurunui
Hurunui
Hurunui District
Hurunui